Italo Zannier (born 9 June 1932, in Spilimbergo) is an Italian art historian, photographer, academic and historian of photography.

Biography 

First in Italy to hold a chair of "history of photography" he taught at IUAV and at the Faculty of Letters of Ca 'Foscari University also in Venice, he also taught at Dams in Bologna and at the Faculty of Cultural Heritage of Ravenna and at the Catholic University of Milan. He is a member of the "Sociètè europeènne d'histoire de la photographie". He has published more than 500 books between historical and scientific catalogs and publications. He had an honorary degree in Conservation of cultural heritage from the University of Udine. President of the scientific committees of the Alinari Museum of the History of Photography in Florence and of the Lestans Photography Research and Archiving Center, which he founded in 1994. Curator of dozens of exhibitions, including the one on the Mediterranean landscape organized in Seville on the occasion of the Expo 1992 is the photographic section of Italian Metamorphosis, the great exhibition dedicated to Italian art from the Guggenheim in New York in 1994. He also edited the photography section at various editions of the Venice Art Biennale including the last one in 2011 and at the Venice Architecture Biennale. Many great contemporary Italian photographers owe his fame as a popularizer [without source]. He taught photography at the Advanced Industrial Design Course in Venice, the first Italian Industrial Design School in the early 1960s.

Works (selection)

Bibliography on Italo Zannier

References

External links 
 

1932 births
Italian art historians
Living people
Italian photographers